Agios Ioannis Malountas is a village in the Nicosia District of Cyprus, located 5 km north of Malounta.

References

Communities in Nicosia District